The Radcliffe Mill is a historic grist mill and related structures located in Chestertown, Kent County, Maryland, United States. It consists of a Mill Building, built in 1891; Grain Elevator, probably constructed around 1924; and Annex / Seed House. The complex is historically significant for its association with the development of agriculture and the associated grist milling industry in Kent County. The present complex occupies land along Radcliffe Creek that has been associated with milling for about 300 years. A mill operated in this approximate location from 1694 until 1997.

The Radcliffe Mill was listed on the National Register of Historic Places in 2006.

References

External links
, including photo from 2005, at Maryland Historical Trust

Grinding mills in Maryland
Buildings and structures in Kent County, Maryland
Industrial buildings completed in 1891
National Register of Historic Places in Kent County, Maryland
Grinding mills on the National Register of Historic Places in Maryland